Saint Joseph's GAC Craigbane is a Gaelic Athletic Association club based in Craigbane County Londonderry, Northern Ireland. The club is a member of the Derry GAA and currently cater for both Gaelic football and Ladies' Gaelic football.

Underage teams up to U-12's play in North Derry league and championships, from U-14 upwards teams compete in All-Derry competitions.

Gaelic football
Craigbane fields Gaelic football teams at U8, U10, U12, U14, U16, Minor, Reserve and Senior levels. The club's biggest success came in 2001 and 2011 when they won the Ulster Intermediate Club Football Championship. They have also won the Derry Intermediate Football Championship on seven occasions.

History
The first officially formed Gaelic football club in Craigbane was Lamh Dearg, which was established in 1934. They played in the North Derry League and lost to Claudy in their first game. Lamh Dearg soon folded, but a Craigbane team was reformed in 1959 under the guidance of Philip Crossan. Their first game was a 4–18 to 0–02 victory over Claudy.

Like much of rural Ireland, Craigbane suffered greatly in the 1960s from emigration and the club folded in 1962. The present club, St Joseph's GAC Craigbane came into existence in 1972 under the leadership of Gerry Crossan. The side played in Division 4 and their first game was a victory away to Coleraine. St. Joseph's were runners up to Drum in the 1973 Derry Junior Football Championship and won Division 4 the following year. At the end of the 1975 season, Craigbane were promoted to Senior football for the first time. Their first game in Division 1 was a defeat against Glen on a 2–09 to 1–09 scoreline. Craigbane were relegated to Division 2 for the 1977 season and were back playing Intermediate football for the next five years.

In 1983 Eddie McElhinney became the first Craigbane player to win an All-Ireland medal went he was Gaelic football and Hurling positions#Center Half Forward on the Derry minor side that won the All-Ireland Minor Football Championship against Cork. Craigbane first Championship trophy came in 1985 when they beat Claudy in the Derry Intermediate Reserve Championship final. They won the cup again two years later. 1986 was a successful year where they won the Derry Intermediate Football Championship and the Dr Kerlin Cup, beating An Lúb and Faughanvale in the respective finals. They also won the League Division 2. The following year Craigbane became the first ever Derry club to retain the Intermediate Championship when they beat Claudy after a replay. The club finished joint top of Division 2.

St Joseph's current pitch, Páirc Gheárod Uí Chrosaín, was officially opened by GAA President Peter Quinn (GAA President) and blessed by Bishop Daly on 13 May 1990. The club won the Intermediate Championship for a third team in 1992 and the team also won the 1994 Dr Kerlin Cup. Craigbane beat Banagher in the 1995 Intermediate Championship final and in the Bishop's Cup final. 1997 saw Craigbane win five trophies. They defeated Claudy in the Intermediate Championship final at Celtic Park. The club also won the Dr. Kerlin Cup, the Bishops Cup and Division 2. The Reserves also won the Grade B Championship defeating Drumsurn at Claudy. 2000 saw the club win their sixth Derry Intermediate Championship. They went on to win the 2001 Ulster Intermediate Club Football Championship, their greatest success to date, defeating Inniskeen of Monaghan in the final.

Honours

Senior
Ulster Intermediate Club Football Championship: 2
2001, 2011
Derry Intermediate Football Championship: 7
1986, 1987, 1992, 1995, 1997, 2000, 2011
Derry Intermediate Football League: 3
1986, 1997, 2011
Derry Football League Division Four: 1
1974
Bishops Cup 2
1995, 1997
Dr Kerlin Cup 6
1986, 1994, 1997, 1998, 2006, 2009
James O'Hagan Cup 1
2003
Derry Football League Division Three:  1
2022
Derry Junior Football Championship: 1
2022

Reserves
Derry Intermediate Reserve Football Championship: 3
1985, 1987, 1997
Derry Junior Reserve Football Championship: 1
2021

Minor
North Derry Minor Football Championship: 1
1994

U17
B2 Championship: 1
2021

Under-16
 North Derry Under-16 'B' Football Championship: 3
 2004 2016 2018 
 North Derry Under-16 'B' Football League: 1
 2004

Under-14
 North Derry Under-14 'B' Football League: 1
 2007 and 2008

Note: The above lists may be incomplete. Please add any other honours you know of.

See also
Derry Senior Football Championship
List of Gaelic games clubs in Derry

References

Gaelic games clubs in County Londonderry
Gaelic football clubs in County Londonderry